Yan Cabral (born 13 May 1983 in Rio de Janeiro, Brazil) is a mixed martial artist, grappler and 4th degree Brazilian jiu-jitsu black belt practitioner and instructor associated with the Nova União academy. A former UFC fighter, Cabral trained mixed martial art (MMA) competing in the lightweight division. Head coach of the Aranha Association team, Cabral teaches out of Barcelona.

Mixed Martial Arts career

Background and early career
Cabral currently trains with team Nova Uniao alongside fighters such as Wagnney Fabiano, former UFC Featherweight Champion José Aldo, former UFC Bantamweight Champion Renan Barão.

Cabral made his professional MMA debut fighting in Luxembourg in December 2007.  Over the next four years, he quickly amassed an undefeated record of 10-0.  All of his wins have come via submission with Cabral never having been into the third round in any of his fights.

DREAM
In 2011, Cabral signed with DREAM to compete in their welterweight division.  In his debut, he faced Kazushi Sakuraba at Dream.17.  Cabral won the fight via submission in the second round, earning him his highest profile win to date.

The Ultimate Fighter: Brazil
In March 2013, it was revealed that Cabral was a cast member of The Ultimate Fighter: Brazil 2. He won his elimination fight to get into the TUF house, defeating Ronaldo Oliveira Silva by rear naked choke submission in round 1.  He was chosen to be a member of Team Werdum and defeated David Vieira before being removed from the show due to a broken hand. At this point Cabral held an MMA record of 12 fights and 12 wins all by submission.

Ultimate Fighting Championship
Cabral made his official UFC debut at UFC Fight Night: Maia vs. Shields, where he defeated David Mitchell by unanimous decision.

In his second fight for the promotion, Cabral faced Zak Cummings at UFC Fight Night: Brown vs. Silva. Despite controlling Cummings on the ground for a large portion of the fight, Cabral lost the fight by unanimous decision.

Cabral returned on 25 October 2014 at UFC 179, where he faced Naoyuki Kotani.  Cabral won the fight via second round rear naked choke.

Cabral was expected to face Mairbek Taisumov on 24 January 2015 at UFC on Fox 14.  However, Cabral was pulled from the fight for undisclosed reasons and was replaced by promotional newcomer Anthony Christodoulou.

Cabral was expected to face K. J. Noons on 30 May 2015 at UFC Fight Night 67.  However, Cabral was forced out of the bout after contracting Dengue Fever and replaced by Alex Oliveira.

Cabral faced Johnny Case on 7 November 2015 at UFC Fight Night 77. He lost the fight by unanimous decision. Cabral faced Reza Madadi on 8 May 2016 at UFC Fight Night 87. He lost the fight via TKO in the third round after a brutal uppercut.

Championships and achievements

Brazilian jiu-jitsu 
Main Achievements (at black belt level):

 CBJJO World Cup Champion (2009)
 2nd Place CBJJO World Cup Championship (2008)
 2nd Place IBJJF European Championship (2009 / 2007)
 3rd Place IBJJF World Championship (2001

Mixed martial arts record

|-
|Win
|align=center|13–3
|Zalimkhan Yusupov
|Technical Submission (rear-naked choke)
|World Kings Glory MMA 2
|
|align=center|1
|align=center|1:01
|Harbin, China
|
|-
|Loss
|align=center|12–3
|Reza Madadi
|TKO (punches)
|UFC Fight Night: Overeem vs. Arlovski
|
|align=center|3
|align=center|1:56
|Rotterdam, Netherlands
|
|-
|Loss
|align=center|12–2
|Johnny Case
|Decision (unanimous)
|UFC Fight Night: Belfort vs. Henderson 3
|
|align=center|3
|align=center|5:00
|São Paulo, Brazil
|
|-
|Win
|align=center|12–1
|Naoyuki Kotani
|Submission (rear-naked choke)
|UFC 179
|
|align=center|2
|align=center|3:06
|Rio de Janeiro, Brazil
|
|-
|Loss
|align=center|11–1
|Zak Cummings
|Decision (unanimous)
|UFC Fight Night: Brown vs. Silva
|
|align=center|3
|align=center|5:00
|Cincinnati, Ohio, United States
|
|-
|Win
|align=center| 11–0
| David Mitchell
| Decision (unanimous)
| UFC Fight Night: Maia vs. Shields
| 
|align=center| 3
|align=center| 5:00
| Barueri, Brazil
| 
|-
|Win
|align=center| 10–0
| Kazushi Sakuraba
| Submission (arm-triangle choke)
| Dream 17
| 
|align=center| 2
|align=center| 2:42
| Saitama, Japan
|
|-
|Win
|align=center| 9–0
| Djordje Beric
| Submission (arm-triangle choke)
| Strengt and Honor Championship 2
| 
|align=center| 1
|align=center| 1:30
| Geneva, Switzerland
|
|-
|Win
|align=center| 8–0
| Arbi Agujev
| Submission (armbar)
| Vienna Fight Night: Fabulous Las Vegas
| 
|align=center| 2
|align=center| 1:40
| Vienna, Austria
|
|-
|Win
|align=center| 7–0
| Peter Angerer
| Submission (kimura)
| Strengt and Honor Championship 1
| 
|align=center| 1
|align=center| 3:45
| Geneva, Switzerland
|
|-
|Win
|align=center| 6–0
| Mattias Awad
| Submission (arm-triangle choke)
| Superior Challenge 3
| 
|align=center| 2
|align=center| 2:35
| Stockholm, Sweden
|
|-
|Win
|align=center| 5–0
| Gary Kono
| Submission (arm-triangle choke)
| Yamabushi: Combat Sport Night 5
| 
|align=center| 1
|align=center| 1:30
| Geneva, Switzerland
|
|-
|Win
|align=center| 4–0
| Catalin Ersen
| Submission (arm-triangle choke)
| Almogavers 1
| 
|align=center| 2
|align=center| 1:33
| Barcelona, Spain
|
|-
|Win
|align=center| 3–0
| Francis Guilherme
| Submission (kimura)
| Shooto: Brazil 8
| 
|align=center| 2
|align=center| 2:18
| Rio de Janeiro, Brazil
|
|-
|Win
|align=center| 2–0
| Christos Petroutsos
| Submission (armbar)
| Fight Fiesta de Luxe: Unstoppable	
| 
|align=center| 1
|align=center| 4:37
|Luxembourg City, Luxembourg
|
|-
|Win
|align=center| 1–0
| Chas Jacquier
| Submission (rear-naked choke)
| Fight Fiesta: de Luxe 3
| 
|align=center| 1
|align=center| N/A
|Luxembourg City, Luxembourg
|
|-

See also
 List of current UFC fighters
 List of male mixed martial artists

References

External links
 
 

1983 births
Living people
Brazilian male mixed martial artists
Mixed martial artists utilizing Brazilian jiu-jitsu
Brazilian practitioners of Brazilian jiu-jitsu
Sportspeople from Rio de Janeiro (city)
Brazilian expatriate sportspeople in Spain
People awarded a black belt in Brazilian jiu-jitsu
Ultimate Fighting Championship male fighters